Blankson Anoff (born 24 March 2001) is a Ghanaian footballer who plays as a midfielder for Swift.

Career

As a youth player, Anoff joined the Ivorian JMG Academy. In 2019, he signed for Clermont in the French Ligue 1. In 2020, Anoff was sent on loan to Austrian second division club Lustenau, where he made 23 appearances and scored 3 goals. On 11 September 2020, he debuted for Lustenau during a 1–1 draw with SV Horn. On 3 October 2020, Anoff scored his first goal for Lustenau during a 4–0 win over Vorwärts Steyr. In 2021, he signed for Swift in Luxembourg.

References

2001 births
Living people
Ghanaian footballers
Association football midfielders
Clermont Foot players
Championnat National 3 players
Luxembourg National Division players
FC Swift Hesperange players
SC Austria Lustenau players
2. Liga (Austria) players
Ghanaian expatriate footballers
Expatriate footballers in Ivory Coast
Expatriate footballers in Austria
Expatriate footballers in Luxembourg
Expatriate footballers in France
Ghanaian expatriate sportspeople in Ivory Coast
Ghanaian expatriate sportspeople in Austria
Ghanaian expatriate sportspeople in Luxembourg
Ghanaian expatriate sportspeople in France
JMG Academy players